is one of 24 wards of Osaka, Japan. It is in the west of central Osaka ("Nishi" means "west"), and is generally flat. 80% of the area was destroyed by bombing in World War II, and was not regenerated until the mid-1960s.

Governments and International organizations 
Local government
Osaka city, Nishi ward office (at near Metro Nishi-Nagahori Station)
Consulate
Chinese Consulate (at near Metro Awaza Station)

Culture 
Central Osaka Library (near Metro Nishi-Nagahori Station)
Utsubo Park
Kyocera Dome Osaka baseball stadium

Economy
Several companies have their headquarters in the ward: Toyo Tire & Rubber Company in the Edobori area and NTN Corporation in the Kyomachibori area. Konica Minolta has its Osaka office in the ward.

Several airlines have offices in Nishi-ku, among them:
 China Southern Airlines, on the first floor of the Shinanobashi Mitsui Building (信濃橋三井ビル Shinanobashi Mitsui Biru).
 China Eastern Airlines in the Higobashi Lucent Building's (肥後橋ルーセントビル Higobashi Rūsento Biru) first floor.
 Hainan Airlines on the fifth floor of the Century Building in Nishi-ku.

Diplomatic missions
The Consulate-General of the People's Republic of China in Osaka is located in Nishi-ku.

Education

Osaka YMCA International High School is located in Nishi-ku.

References

External links

Official website of Nishi Ward 

Wards of Osaka